Sherwin Burickson (1934–2004) psychologist, writer, and student of the ideas of G. I. Gurdjieff, was the first Jewish editor of the New Catholic Encyclopedia, and the author of A Concise Dictionary of Contemporary History, published in 1959. The dictionary served during the interwar period as a guidebook for the CIA around the world.

He survived two episodes of acute myelocytic leukemia. He finally died of colon cancer. He was survived by his wife Sue (a painter) and two children, Abraham Burickson and Lily.

1934 births
2004 deaths
Deaths from colorectal cancer
20th-century American male writers
American psychologists